Mines Wellness City, formerly known as Mines Resort City, is an integrated Health and Wellness resort township in Seri Kembangan, Selangor, Malaysia.

Background
The land was formerly the world's largest open cast tin mine. Currently the development consists of:
 Palace of the Golden Horses - a luxury hotel;
 Mines Wellness Hotel - healthcare-oriented hotel;
 The Australian International School Malaysia (AISM);
 Golden Horses Health Sanctuary;
 The Mines shopping mall;
 Mines Waterfront Business Park;
 Mines Resort & Golf Club;
 Mines International Exhibition Convention Centre (MIECC); and
 The Heritage Residences and Retail 
 Philea

It is both an expansion and transformation of the former Mines Resort City. The expansion of the city is part of the government's Economic Transformation Plan (ETP) which is spearheaded by PEMANDU (Performance Management and Delivery Unit), under the Prime Minister's Department.

It was announced on 11 January 2011 by the prime minister of Malaysia Datuk Seri Najib Tun Razak.

History
The current Mines Wellness City was formerly the site of the Hong Fatt Mine, which was the largest opencast tin mine in the world, covering , including the lakes. The Malaysian Government alienated the land to Country Heights Holdings Bhd (CHHB) on 30 March 1988 for recreational and tourism purposes. Country Heights Holdings Berhad is founded by Y.Bhg. Tan Sri Dato' Paduka Lee Kim Yew and incorporated officially on 10 May 1984 under a private limited company with the name of Kurniata Sdn Bhd.

Facilities
In order to complement the tourism theme, a five-star hotel, the Palace of the Golden Horses  with a distinctive architectural design and Mines Wellness Hotel  (formerly known as The Mines Beach Resort and Spa) with a man-made beach and swimming lagoon were built. A leading Health Screening Centre and Traditional Chinese Medicine Centre was also located in Mines Wellness City.

Other components of development completed to date within the Mines Resort City are the Mines shopping mall and a former theme park named Mines Wonderland (operated between 1997 and 2011). In March 2010, CapitaMalls Asia has re-branded Mines Shopping Fair to a contemporary neighborhood shopping mall with a major upgrading work, including additional retail space, revamping the carpark system, changing new wash rooms, creating additional link bridges and new sets of escalators inside the mall.

Economic Transformation Programme
The transformation of Mines Wellness City into the nation's very first Wellness City is part of the government's Economic Transformation Plan (ETP) which is spearheaded by PEMANDU (Performance Management and Delivery Unit), under the Prime Minister’s Department. By the year 2020, the City is envisioned to be a RM 5.5 billion development, playing a central role in tourism and becoming the foremost wellness destination in the country.

Access

Public transport
 KTM Serdang is the nearest railway station. Although it is possible to pedestrian walk from the station via the overhead bridge of the expressway to the majority areas such as The Mines mall via 10 minute walk, some of the areas like Palace of Golden Horses are still require to use own transport to go there. The KLIA Express tracks also run near here, parallel to the KTM tracks, but does not stop here.

Car
Besraya Expressway  is the most direct route into MINES Resort City. BESRAYA interchanges into SILK  at the southern boundary of the project.

MINES Resort City sits next to the southern gateway into Kuala Lumpur from Negeri Sembilan, Malacca or Johor for motorists coming from PLUS .

Gallery

References

External links

Mines Wellness City Official website

1988 establishments in Malaysia
Petaling District
Golf clubs and courses in Malaysia
Hotels in Malaysia
Shopping malls in Selangor